The 2007–08 Vijay Hazare Trophy was the sixth season of the Vijay Hazare Trophy, a List A cricket tournament in India. It was contested between 27 domestic cricket teams of India, starting in February and finishing in April 2008. In the final, Saurashtra beat Bengal by 6 wickets to win their maiden title.

Group stage

Central Zone

East Zone

North Zone

South Zone

West Zone

Knockout Stage

Pre Quarter-finals

Quarter-finals

Semi-finals

Final

References

External links
 Series home at ESPN Cricinfo

Vijay Hazare Trophy
Vijay Hazare Trophy